Cecilia 'Kathleen' Best (married name Thompson), was a female English international table tennis player.

She won a bronze medal at the 1952 World Table Tennis Championships in the Corbillon Cup (women's team event). The following year at the 1953 World Table Tennis Championships she won two medals; a silver medal in the women's team and a bronze in the women's doubles with Ermelinde Wertl.

At the 1954 World Table Tennis Championships she picked up her fourth and fifth World Championship medals; winning a bronze in the women's team and a silver in the women's doubles with Ann Haydon-Jones.

She married her coach Alan Thompson in 1952 in Yorkshire and won two English Open titles.

See also
 List of England players at the World Team Table Tennis Championships
 List of World Table Tennis Championships medalists

References

1933 births
Living people
World Table Tennis Championships medalists
English female table tennis players